Hera is a fictional deity appearing in American comic books published by Marvel Comics. The character is based on the Greek Goddess of the same name. Hera first appeared in the pages of Thor #129, written by Stan Lee and drawn by Jack Kirby.

Fictional character biography

Hera is the Queen of the Olympian pantheon and wife of Zeus. Neptune and Pluto are her brothers, Demeter and Vesta are her sisters, and Ares, Hephaestus, and Hebe are her children, all by Zeus. She was born on the island of Samos, and now resides with the rest of the pantheon in Olympus.

Hera was present at the time of a pact made a millennia ago to end war between Asgard and Olympus. It was also revealed that she was present during the Trojan War. When Hercules was gravely wounded fighting the Masters of Evil, Zeus blamed the Avengers for his condition. Hera sought to aid the Avengers in Olympus against the wrath of Zeus. Later, Hera challenged Ares to a contest to see who could cause Hercules more sorrow. She began a plot against Hercules concerning his growing love for the mortal Taylor Madison.

She has appeared as the primary antagonist in The Incredible Hercules. Following the death of Zeus, she inherits both his thunderbolt and the leadership of the Pantheon. In alliance with Pluto, she forcibly acquires Poseidon's stake in the Olympus corporation, and expels from the Pantheon all of Zeus' children holding a meeting with Apollo, Artemis, and Hephaestus, vowing to dedicate all her efforts to killing Hercules and Athena.

She is the CEO of the Olympus Group, a megacorporation whose subsidiaries include the Excello Soap Company, which sponsored the contest that located Cho. In the process of her war on Hercules and Athena, she gained herself the enmity of Norman Osborn, who saw her as a business rival but later allied with her. She orders Huntsman to murder the superhero Aegis and steal his magic breastplate. She then gives the breastplate to Typhon.

Uncovering the treachery of her daughter Hebe, she attacked her, causing her to flee in search of Hercules. It is later revealed that Hera was indirectly responsible for the death of Amadeus Cho's parents, as she aided a mortal Pythagoras Dupree in killing any potential rivals, in order to spite Athena.  She now plans to unleash an unknown weapon called Continuum upon the world in order to exterminate mankind for a fourth time. She has also been revealed to be sexually involved with Typhon.

Elsewhere, angry at her son Ares' neglect of his responsibilities as an Olympian, she arranged a trap for him and a squad of his human soldiers, promising Ares' deceased son Kyknos his father's place as God of War if Kyknos could slay him.

Hera expands her Olympus Group by restoring her son Argus Panoptes to life where he operated New Olympus' surveillance program called the Panopticon, restoring Arachne to protect New Olympus, resurrected the Chimera to assist a Cyclops and some Skeleton Warriors into guarding the caverns beneath New Olympus, and even obtaining Lamia's obedience to help her servants battle Hercules and the Mighty Avengers on her behalf.

Hera's weapon Continuum is revealed to be a device to recreate the universe in an improved version, destroying the existing one in the process. Hercules and Athena assemble a group of Avengers to stop Hera, including the reborn Zeus. They are opposed by the inventions of Hephastaus, and Hera's forces, which include Argus, and Arachne. The knowledge of Zeus' return stuns Hera, and Zeus succeeds in convincing her to stop the Continuum machine. However, Typhon reveals that he is now free from the control of the bands used to control him, he resists the lightning used against him, and slays both Hera, by blasting her head off, and Zeus. The souls of the two gods are seen in the company of Thanatos, the God of Death, reunited and being taken to the underworld.

During the Chaos War storyline, Hera is among the dead released by Pluto to defend the Underworld from the forces of Amatsu-Mikaboshi. Hera is then seen among the gods that are enslaved by Amatsu-Mikaboshi.

In the aftermath of the fight with Amatsu-Mikaboshi, Hera is back among the living.

Powers and abilities
Hera possesses the typical powers of an Olympian, including immense strength, stamina, durability, speed, and healing, as well as virtual immortality. She has the ability to manipulate vast amounts of energy for numerous purposes, such as shapeshifting or inter-dimensional teleportation. Hera can read people's minds by physically observing their thoughts. She is an excellent strategist and a formidable unarmed combatant.

Following Zeus' death, she inherits his position and wields a thunderbolt.

Reception
 In 2022, Sportskeeda ranked Hera 6th in their "10 best Greek gods from Marvel comics " list.
 In 2022, Screen Rant included Hera in their "10 Most Powerful Olympian Gods In Marvel Comics" list.

Other versions
In one alternate future, Hera and the other Olympians leave Olympus in the 23rd century, leaving Hercules there to father a new race of gods.

References

External links
 

Characters created by Jack Kirby
Characters created by Stan Lee
Classical mythology in Marvel Comics
Comics characters introduced in 1966
Fictional characters with dimensional travel abilities
Fictional characters with energy-manipulation abilities
Fictional characters with immortality
Fictional characters with superhuman durability or invulnerability
Fictional goddesses
Greek and Roman deities in fiction
Hera
Marvel Comics characters who are shapeshifters
Marvel Comics characters who can move at superhuman speeds
Marvel Comics characters who can teleport
Marvel Comics characters who use magic
Marvel Comics characters with accelerated healing
Marvel Comics characters with superhuman strength
Marvel Comics female supervillains
Marvel Comics telepaths